James Petigru Boyce (January 11, 1827 – December 28, 1888) was an American pastor, theologian, professor and chaplain who was one of the founders of the  Southern Baptist Theological Seminary.

Biography

Early life
James Petigru Boyce was born in 1827. He was educated at Brown University under Francis Wayland, whose evangelical sermons contributed to Boyce's conversion, and at Princeton Theological Seminary under Charles Hodge who led Boyce to appreciate Calvinistic theology.

Career
After completing studies at Princeton, he served as pastor of the Columbia S.C. Baptist Church and as a faculty member at Furman University. In 1859 he founded the Southern Baptist Theological Seminary in Greenville, South Carolina, to establish a seminary that did not view owning slaves as disqualifying in becoming a missionary   After the war ended, he resumed office as chair of the seminary and relocated it to Louisville, Kentucky. He taught theology from 1859 until his death in 1888 and served as the President of the institution. Throughout his ministry, Boyce insisted on the importance of theological education for all ministers. In a preface, he described his Abstract of Systematic Theology, published the year before his death, as follows: "This volume is published the rather as a practical textbook, for the study of the system of doctrine taught in the Word of God, than as a contribution to theological science." During his life, Boyce owned 23 slaves.

Civil War 
While the seminary was closed during the Civil War, Boyce served as a chaplain in the Confederate Army . In 1865 he was elected as a representative to the South Carolina Constitutional Convention. He was a prominent advocate of white supremacy who opposed counting the black population in the cenus, stating that in his view it would be the “entering wedge of negro suffrage” also arguing “this is a white man’s government".

Death
Boyce died in Pau, France on December 28, 1888. He had traveled to Europe with his family in early July 1888 and had been expecting to be traveling abroad for a number of months. News reports at the time indicated that he had been suffering from gout and that while traveling his condition worsened and became fatal.

Bibliography

 Nettles, Tom J., and James P. Boyce. Stray Recollections, Short Articles and Public Orations of James P. Boyce. Cape Coral, Fla: Founders Press, 2009.

See also
 Southern Baptist Convention
 Southern Baptist Convention Presidents
 Southern Baptist Theological Seminary

References

External links
 Abstract of Systematic Theology by James P. Boyce online

1827 births
1888 deaths
19th-century Baptists
19th-century Calvinist and Reformed theologians
American slave owners
American Baptist theologians
American Calvinist and Reformed theologians
Baptists from Kentucky
Brown University alumni
Burials at Cave Hill Cemetery
Confederate States Army chaplains
Furman University faculty
Princeton Theological Seminary alumni
Southern Baptist Convention presidents
Southern Baptist Theological Seminary faculty
Southern Baptist Theological Seminary presidents
Members of the South Carolina House of Representatives